Mel Sanson (born 28 July 1979) is an English singer-songwriter most notable for performing lead vocals and guitar with rock band Kenelis and Murder Ballad duet "White Lillies" with Fairuza Balk.

Early life and career 
Mel was born in Chertsey, Surrey, England and finished her high school years in Camberley, Surrey. Mel is married to Jennifer Sanson since 2018 who is an analogue photographer.

Kenelis 
In 2008, Mel and her band members performed with Ghost of a Thousand & Fightstar at Guilfest's 2008's Rocksound Cave. In January 2009 the band released their first album Remember How It Felt, produced by Angus Cowan. In 2010, the band played numerous Pride stages all over the UK including Brighton Pride, Cardiff Mardis Gras, Birmingham Pride, Sheffield Pride, Nottingham Pride and Suffolk Pride. In 2011 Mel moved to Brighton and in 2012 the new Kenelis EP MOVE was released on Mel's own label, Sanson Records. Produced by Chris Coulter. Show's included Indigo2 at The O2, Greenwich, Ep track ‘GFY’ on Balcony TV in the summer followed by the band's EP launch at The 100 Club. Kenelis continued to perform regular shows on the London Underground scene as well as continuing to play Pride and festival stages including supporting Arcane Roots and Soulfly at Guilfest Big Cheese Cave, until their final shows at Brighton and Hove Pride and Under The Bridge supporting Republica. In 2013 Kenelis won Brighton Music Award – Viewers Choice where Mel met lead singer of Republica, Saffron Sprackling.

LGBTQ+ activism 

In 2012 Mel appeared on the 2012 charity single 'It Does Get Better' created by The L Project. The single benefitted LGBTQ charities and was written in response to the suicide of LGBTQ teenagers.‘It Does Get Better’ not only had chart success but won Outstanding contribution to the LGBTQ Community – 2012. Mel volunteered to be the Artist Liaison and Promoter for live music stages at Brighton and Hove Pride 2012, Brighton and Hove Pride 2013 and Brighton and Hove Pride 2014.

Auxesis 
The band began in 2016 when singer-songwriter Mel Sanson started writing songs with lead guitarist Jack Rowan. Alec Greaves joined the band on drums and the three-piece went into the studio with Mark Roberts and recorded their debut EP, Swallow The Sun. Shows included The Cowley Club, The Quadrant, Sticky Mike's Frog Bar in Brighton and The Black Heart in London. In September 2017 the band performed their final show at the Prince Albert in Brighton.

Armed Love Militia 
In 2017 Mel starting writing dark melancholic grungy folk songs. Later, Fairuza Balk invited Mel to be part of Armed Love Militia music collaboration project. Fairuza sent Mel an Appalachian folk/murder ballad style song called ‘White Lilies' and thought it would sound really great with some harmonies. Mel recorded the track with Fairuza live in one take in downtown LA.

Discography 

 Nobody See's Me (But You) – Single 2007
 Drained – Single – 2008 
 Remember How It Felt – Album 2009
 Jealous – Single 2011
 Fake – Album 2011
 Move – EP 2012
 Ghost – Single – 2018 
 The L Project – It Does Get Better 2012 – single 
 Armed Love Militia – White Lilles with Fairuza Balk 2021 – EP lead track

References

External links

 

1979 births
Living people
English LGBT rights activists
English punk rock musicians
English singer-songwriters